Ruth Aiko Asawa (January 24, 1926 – August 5, 2013) was an American modernist sculptor. Her work is featured in collections at the Solomon R. Guggenheim Museum and the Whitney Museum of American Art in New York City. Fifteen of Asawa's wire sculptures are on permanent display in the tower of San Francisco's de Young Museum in Golden Gate Park, and several of her fountains are located in public places in San Francisco. She was an arts education advocate and the driving force behind the creation of the San Francisco School of the Arts, which was renamed the Ruth Asawa San Francisco School of the Arts in 2010. In 2020, the U.S. Postal Service honored her work by producing a series of ten stamps that commemorate her well-known wire sculptures.

Early life and education
Ruth Aiko Asawa was born in 1926 in Norwalk, California and was one of seven children. Her parents, immigrants from Japan, operated a truck farm until the Japanese American internment during World War II. Except for Ruth's father, the family was interned at an assembly center hastily set up at the Santa Anita racetrack for much of 1942, after which they were sent to Rohwer War Relocation Center in Arkansas. Ruth's father, Umakichi Asawa, was arrested by FBI agents in February 1942 and interned at a detention camp in New Mexico. For six months following, the Asawa family did not know if he was alive or dead. Asawa did not see her father for six years. Ruth's younger sister, Nancy (Kimiko), was visiting family in Japan when her family was interned. She was unable to return, as the U.S. prevented entry even of American citizens from Japan. Nancy was forced to stay in Japan for the duration of the war. Asawa said about the internment:I hold no hostilities for what happened; I blame no one. Sometimes good comes through adversity. I would not be who I am today had it not been for the internment, and I like who I am.

Asawa became interested in art at an early age. As a child, she was encouraged by her third grade teacher to create her own artwork. As a result, Asawa received first prize in a school arts competition in 1939, for her artwork about what makes someone American.

Following her graduation from the internment center's high school, Asawa attended Milwaukee State Teachers College, intending to become an art teacher. She was prevented from attending college on the California coast, as the war had continued and the zone of her intended college was still declared prohibited to ethnic Japanese, whether or not they were American citizens. Unable to get hired for the requisite practice teaching to complete her degree, she left Wisconsin without a degree. (Wisconsin awarded the degree to her in 1998.) Asawa recounted an experience when stopping in Missouri to use the restroom when her and her sister didn't know which bathroom to use. There was a colored and a white toilet at the bus stop and because of the racial discrimination at the time they chose to use the colored toilet. Once at Black Mountain there was more equality for her and other minority students including other Asian Americans and African Americans. While on campus they were equals but in town the reality of racism in America was evident. This led to a direct sense of social consciousness in Asawa's sculptures and an intimacy influenced by the adversity her family experienced as a minority in America.

The summer before her final year in Milwaukee, Asawa traveled to Mexico with her older sister Lois (Masako). Asawa attended an art class at the Universidad Nacional Autonoma de Mexico; among her teachers was Clara Porset, an interior designer from Cuba. A friend of artist Josef Albers, Porset told Asawa about Black Mountain College where he was teaching. Asawa recounted:I was told that it might be difficult for me, with the memories of the war still fresh, to work in a public school. My life might even be in danger. This was a godsend, because it encouraged me to follow my interest in art, and I subsequently enrolled at Black Mountain College in North Carolina.From 1946 to 1949, she studied at Black Mountain College with Josef Albers. Asawa learned to use commonplace materials from Albers and began experimenting with wire, using a variety of techniques. Like all Black Mountain College students, Asawa took courses across a variety of different art forms and this interdisciplinary approach helped to shape her artistic practice. Her study of drawing with Ilya Bolotowsky and Josef Albers was formative. Her drawings from this time explore pattern and repetition, and she was especially intrigued by the meander as a motif. She was particularly influenced by the summer sessions of 1946 and 1948, which featured courses by artist Jacob Lawrence, photography curator and historian Beaumont Newhall, Jean Varda, composer John Cage, choreographer Merce Cunningham, artist Willem de Kooning, sculptor Leo Amino, and R. Buckminster Fuller. According to Asawa, the dance courses she took with Merce Cunningham were especially inspirational. In one class that included fellow student Rauschenberg Asawa reported that they ran down a large hill like it was a dance with flaming torches blasting Stravinsky's Rite of Spring. In contrast, Asawa described her experiences studying under Josef Albers as more formalist and what other students described as Fascist in demeanor and did not consider the feelings of his students in his teachings. She quoted him as saying "If you want to express yourself do that on your own time. Don't do it in my class." He preferred to teach exploration and discover through design rather than the regurgitated freeloaded knowledge taught by other academics. Asawa connected with this approach because of her family's cultural background and what she describes as an intolerance for emotion.

Career
In the 1950s, while a student at Black Mountain College in Asheville, North Carolina, Asawa made a series of crocheted wire sculptures in various abstract forms. Asawa felt that her and her fellow students were ahead of the administration with developing their own form of modernism in sculpture, constantly trying new things. She began with basket designs, and later explored biomorphic forms that hung from the ceiling. She learned the wire-crocheting technique while on a trip to visit Josef Albers while he was on sabbatical in 1947 Toluca, Mexico, where villagers used a similar technique to make baskets from galvanized wire. She explained: 
 After her trip to Mexico, Asawa's drawing teacher, Ilya Bolotowsky, noted that her interest in conventional drawing had been replaced by a fascination with using wire as a way of drawing in space. Her looped-wire sculptures explore the relationship of interior and exterior volumes, creating, as she put it, "a shape that was inside and outside at the same time." They have been described as embodying various material states: interior and exterior, line and volume, past and future. Asawa said "It was in 1946 when I thought I was modern. But now it’s 2002 and you can’t be modern forever." while she was developing her materiality and techniques, experimenting with manual means of visual communications. Experimentation was key in finding her visual identity as an artist. While her technique for making sculptures resembles weaving, she did not study weaving, nor did she use fiber materials. Materials mattered. As a poor college student Asawa embraced inexpensive found objects such as rocks, leaves and sticks because they neither had the funds or access to good paper. Proximity and discovery was their resource.

Asawa's wire sculptures brought her prominence in the 1950s, when her work appeared several times in the Whitney Biennial, in a 1954 exhibition at the San Francisco Museum of Modern Art, and in the 1955 São Paulo Art Biennial.

In 1962, Asawa began experimenting with tied wire sculptures of branching forms rooted in nature, which became increasingly geometric and abstract as she continued to work in that form. With these pieces, she sometimes treated the wire by galvanizing it. She also experimented with electroplating, running the electric current in the "wrong" direction in order to create textural effects. "Ruth was ahead of her time in understanding how sculptures could function to define and interpret space," said Daniell Cornell, curator of the de Young Museum in San Francisco. "This aspect of her work anticipates much of the installation work that has come to dominate contemporary art."

Asawa participated in the Tamarind Lithography Workshop Fellowship in Los Angeles in 1965 as an artist. Collaborating with the seven printmakers at the workshop, she produced fifty-two lithographs of friends, family (including her parents, Umakichi and Haru), natural objects, and plants.

In the 1960s, Asawa began receiving commissions for large-scale sculptures in public and commercial spaces in San Francisco and other cities. Awasa installed her first public sculpture, Andrea (1968), after dark in Ghirardelli Square, hoping to create the impression that it had always been there. The sculpture depicts two cast bronze mermaids in a fountain, one nursing a merbaby, splashing among sea turtles and frogs. The artwork generated much controversy over aesthetics, feminism, and public art upon installation. Lawrence Halprin, the landscape architect who designed the waterfront space, described the sculpture as a suburban lawn ornament and demanded the artwork's removal. Asawa countered: "For the old, it would bring back the fantasy of their childhood, and for the young, it would give them something to remember when they grow old." Many San Franciscans, especially women, supported Asawa's mermaid sculpture and successfully rallied behind her to protect it.

Near Union Square (on Stockton Street, between Post and Sutter Streets), she created a fountain for which she mobilized 200 schoolchildren to mold hundreds of images of the city of San Francisco in dough, which were then cast in iron. Over the years, she went on to design other public fountains and became known in San Francisco as the "fountain lady".

The artist's estate is represented by David Zwirner Gallery.

Ruth Asawa's artwork has continuously risen in value. When her pieces have been offered at auction, her works have realized prices ranging from 500 USD to 5,382,500 USD, depending on size, medium, condition, timing, and market temperament. In 2013, her Untitled sculptures first surpassed one million USD; twice the same day: at Sotheby’s day auction and then at Christie’s evening sale. In 2019, her Untitled (S.387, Hanging Three Separate Layers of Three-Lobed Forms), circa 1955, sold for $4.1 million. Untitled (S.401, Hanging Seven-Lobed, Continuous Interlocking Form, with Spheres within Two Lobes), circa 1953-1954, sold for $5.4 million in 2020. 
.

Public service and arts education activism
Asawa had a passionate commitment to and was an ardent advocate for art education as a transformative and empowering experience, especially for children. In 1968, she was appointed to be a member of the San Francisco Arts Commission and began lobbying politicians and charitable foundations to support arts programs that would benefit young children and average San Franciscans. Asawa helped co-found the Alvarado Arts Workshop for school children in 1968. In the early 1970s, this became the model for the Art Commission's CETA/Neighborhood Arts Program using money from the federal funding program, the Comprehensive Employment and Training Act (CETA), which became a nationally replicated program employing artists of all disciplines to do public service work for the city.

The Alvarado approach worked to integrate the arts and gardening, mirroring Asawa's own upbringing on a farm. Asawa believed in a hands-on experience for children, and followed the approach "learning by doing". Asawa believed in the benefit of children learning from professional artists, something she adopted from learning from practicing artists at Black Mountain College. She believed that classroom teachers could not be expected to teach the arts, on top of all their other responsibilities. 85 percent of the program's budget went toward hiring professional artists and performers for the students to learn from. This was followed up in 1982 by building a public arts high school, the San Francisco School of the Arts, which was renamed the Ruth Asawa San Francisco School of the Arts in her honor in 2010. Asawa would go on to serve on the California Arts Council, the National Endowment for the Arts in 1976, and from 1989 to 1997 she served as a trustee of the Fine Arts Museums of San Francisco.

At the end of her life, Asawa recognized art education as central to the importance of her life's work.

Personal life
In July 1949 Asawa married architect Albert Lanier, whom she met in 1947 at Black Mountain College. The couple had six children: Xavier (1950), Aiko (1950), Hudson (1952), Adam (1956–2003), Addie (1958), and Paul (1959). Albert Lanier died in 2008. Asawa believed that "Children are like plants. If you feed them and water them generally they'll grow." At the time of their marriage, inter-racial marriages were legal in only two states, California and Washington.  The family moved to the Noe Valley neighborhood on Castro at 28th and 23rd, of San Francisco in 1960, where she was active for many years in the community.

Death
Asawa died of natural causes on August 5, 2013, at her San Francisco home at the age of 87.

Awards and honors

 In 2010, School of the Arts High School in San Francisco was renamed Ruth Asawa San Francisco School of the Arts in honor of Asawa.
 In 2020, the United States Postal Service issued a set of postage stamps to honor Ruth Asawa.
 A Google Doodle for May 1, 2019, the first day of Asian Pacific American Heritage Month, was made to celebrate Ruth Asawa.
Because of her crocheted wire sculptures and advocacy efforts in the arts, The Crochet Guild of America has recognized Asawa as an inspiring pioneer in the crochet community.

Selected works

Andrea (1966), the mermaid fountain at Ghirardelli Square, San Francisco, California
Fountain (1973), The Hyatt on Union Square, San Francisco, California
Fountains (1976), The Buchanan Mall (Nihonmachi), San Francisco, California
Aurora (1986), the origami-inspired fountain on the San Francisco waterfront.
The Japanese-American Internment Memorial Sculpture (1994) in San Jose, California
The Garden of Remembrance (2002) at San Francisco State University, San Francisco, California

Awards
1966: First Dymaxion Award for Artist/Scientist
1974: Gold Medal from the American Institute of Architects
1990: San Francisco Chamber of Commerce Cyril Magnin Award
1993: Honor Award from the Women's Caucus for the Arts
1995: Asian American Art Foundations Golden Ring Lifetime Achievement Award
2002: Honorary doctorate by San Francisco State University 
 Since 1982, San Francisco has declared February 12 to be "Ruth Asawa Day"

Film
 Snyder, Robert, producer (1978) Ruth Asawa: On Forms and Growth, Pacific Palisades, CA: Masters and Masterworks Production
 Soe, Valerie, and Ruth Asawa directors (2003) Each One Teach One: The Alvarado School Art Program, San Francisco:  Alvarado Arts Program.

See also

 History of the Japanese in San Francisco

References

Further reading
 Abrahamson, Joan and Sally Woodridge (1973) The Alvarado School Art Community Program. San Francisco: Alvarado School Workshop.
 Bancroft Library (1990) Ruth Asawa, Art, Competence and Citywide Cooperation for San Francisco," in The Arts and the Community Oral History Project. University of California, Berkeley.
 Bell, Tiffany and Robert Storr (2017) Ruth Asawa. David Zwirner Books: New York.
 Chase, Marilyn (2020) Everything She Touched: The Life of Ruth Asawa. Chronicle Books: San Francisco.
 Cook, Mariana (2000) Couples. Chronicle Books.
 Cornell, Daniell et al. (2006) The Sculpture of Ruth Asawa: Contours in the Air. University of California Press.
 Cunningham, Imogen (1970) Photographs, Imogen Cunningham. University of Washington Press.
 D'Aquino, Andrea (2019) A Life Made by Hand: Ruth Asawa (children's book). Princeton Architectural Press.
 Dobbs, Stephen (1981) "Community and Commitment: An Interview with Ruth Asawa", in Art Education vol 34 no 5.
 Faul, Patricia et al. (1995) The New Older Woman. Celestial Arts.
 Harris, Mary Emma (1987) The Arts at Black Mountain College. MIT Press.
 Hatfield, Zack. "Ruth Asawa: Tending the Metal Garden", NY Daily, New York Review of Books, September 21, 2017
 Hopkins, Henry and Mimi Jacobs (1982) 50 West Coast Artists. Chronicle Books.
 Jepson, Andrea and Sharon Litsky (1976) The Alvarado Experience. Alvarado Art Workshop.
 Laib, Jonathan et al. (2015) Ruth Asawa: Line by Line. Christie's show catalogue.
 McClintock, Elizabeth (1977) The Japanese Tea Garden, Golden Gate Park. San Francisco: The John McLaren Society. (Plant illustrations by Asawa.)
 Molesworth, Ellen et al. (2022) All Is Possible. (2021). David Zwirner Books: New York.
 Rountree, Cathleen (1999) On Women Turning 70: Honoring the Voices of Wisdom. Jossey-Bass.
 Rubinstein, Charlotte Streifer (1992) American Women Sculptors. G.K. Hall.
 San Francisco Museum of Art. (1973) Ruth Asawa: A Retrospective View. San Francisco Museum of Art.
 Schatz, Howard (1992) Gifted Woman. Pacific Photographic Press.
 Schenkenberg, Tamara et al. (2019) Ruth Asawa: Life's Work. New Haven: Yale University Press.
 Schoettler, Joan (2018) Ruth Asawa: A Sculpting Life (children's book). Gretna, Louisiana: Pelican Publishing.
 Villa, Carlos et al. (1994) Worlds in Collision: Dialogues on Multicultural Art Issues. San Francisco Art Institute.
 Woodridge, Sally (1973) Ruth Asawa's San Francisco Fountain. San Francisco Museum of Art.

External links

 
 
 ;
 and the detailed 
 
 
 
 
 

1926 births
2013 deaths
American women sculptors
Black Mountain College alumni
Japanese-American internees
University of Wisconsin–Milwaukee alumni
American artists of Japanese descent
Artists from the San Francisco Bay Area
People from Norwalk, California
20th-century American sculptors
20th-century American women artists
Sculptors from California
21st-century American sculptors
21st-century American women artists